The 33rd National Assembly of Quebec was the provincial legislature in Quebec, Canada that  was elected in the 1985 Quebec general election and sat from December 16, 1985, to March 8, 1988 (first session) and from March 8, 1988, to August 9, 1989 (second session). The Quebec Liberal Party led by Robert Bourassa was the governing party, while the Parti Québécois, led by Pierre-Marc Johnson and later Jacques Parizeau, was the official opposition.

Seats per political party

 After the 1985 elections

Member list

This was the list of members of the National Assembly of Quebec that were elected in the 1985 election:

Other elected MNAs

Other MNAs were elected in by-elections in this mandate

 Robert Bourassa, Quebec Liberal Party, Saint-Laurent, January 20, 1986 
 Harold Thuringer, Quebec Liberal Party, Notre-Dame-de-Grâce, September 14, 1987 
 René Serge Larouche, Quebec Liberal Party, Anjou, June 20, 1988 
 Gaston Blackburn, Quebec Liberal Party, Roberval, June 20, 1988 
 Robert Lesage, Quebec Liberal Party, Hull, May 29, 1989 
 Norman MacMillan, Quebec Liberal Party, Papineau, May 29, 1989

Cabinet Ministers

 Prime Minister and Executive Council President: Robert Bourassa
 Deputy Premier: Lise Bacon
 Agriculture, Fisheries and Food: Michel Pagé
 Labor: Pierre Paradis (1985–1988), Yves Séguin (1988–1989)
 Workforce and Revenue Security: Pierre Paradis (1985–1988), André Bourbeau (1988–1989)
 Administration and President of the Treasury Board: Paul Gobeil (1985–1988), Daniel Johnson Jr. (1988–1989)
 Provisioning and Services: Gilles Rocheleau (1985–1988), Richard French (1988), Andre Vallerand (1988–1989)
 Cultural Affairs: Lise Bacon, Guy Rivard (Delegate Minister) (1988–1989)
 Cultural Communities and Immigration: Louise Robic (1985–1989), Monique Gagnon-Tremblay (1989)
 Cultural Communities (Delegate): Violette Trépanier (1989)
 Health and Social Services: Thérèse Lavoie-Roux, Robert Dutil (Delegate) (1987–1988), Louise Robic (1989)
 Family, Health and Social Services (Delegate): Robert Dutil (1987–1988)
 Status of Women: Monique Gagnon-Tremblay
 Education, Superior education and Science: Claude Ryan
 Recreation, Hunting and Fishing: Yvon Picotte
 Mines: Raymond Savoie (1985–1986)
 Mines and Indian Affairs: Raymond Savoie (1986–1989)
 Fisheries (Delegate):Robert Dutil (1985–1987), Yvon Picotte (1987–1989)
 Transportation: Marc-Yvan Côté
 Communications: Richard French (1985–1988), Robert Dutil (1988–1989)
 Municipal Affairs: André Bourbeau (1985–1988), Pierre Paradis (1988–1989)
 Environment: Clifford Lincoln (1985–1988), Lise Bacon (1988–1989), Gaston Blackburn (Delegate) (1989)
 Energy and Resources: John Ciaccia
 Forests: Albert Côté
 Canadian Intergovernmental Affairs: Gil Rémillard
 International Relation: Gil Rémillard (1985–1988)
 International Affairs: Paul Gobeil (1988–1989) André Vallerand (Delegate) (1988),
 Electoral reform: Michel Gratton
 Tourism: Yvon Picotte (1985–1987), Michel Gratton (1987–1989)
 Justice: Herbert Marx (1985–1988), Gil Rémillard (1988–1989)
 Solicitor General: Gerard Latulippe (1985–1987), Herbert Marx (1987–1988)
 Public Safety: Herbert Marx (1988), Gil Rémillard (1988–1989)
 Finances: Gérard D. Levesque
 Finances and Privatization (Delegate): Pierre Fortier (1986–1989)
 Privatization (Delegate): Pierre Fortier (1985–1986)
 Revenue: Michel Gratton (1985–1987), Yves Séguin (1987–1989)
 Small and Medium Companies: André Vallerand (1985–1988)
 Foreign Trade and Technology Development: Pierre MacDonald (1985–1988)
 Industry and Commerce: Daniel Johnson Jr (1985–1988)
 Industry, Commerce and Technology Development: Pierre MacDonald (1988)
 Industry, Commerce and Technology: Pierre MacDonald (1988)
 Technology Development (Delegate): Richard French (1988)
 Technology (Delegate):Richard French (1988–1989), Guy Rivard (1989)

New electoral districts

An electoral map reform was made in 1988 and the changes were implemented in the 1989 elections.

 Beauharnois and Huntingdon were merged to form Beauharnois-Huntingdon
 Chutes-de-la Chaudière was formed from parts of Lévis.
 La Pinière was formed from parts of La Prairie.
 Masson was formed from parts of L'Assomption and Terrebonne.
 Pointe-aux-Trembles was formed from parts of LaFontaine.
 Sainte-Marie and Saint-Jacques merged to form Sainte-Marie–Saint-Jacques.
 Vaudreuil-Soulanges was split in two ridings: Vaudreuil and Salaberry-Soulanges.

References
 1985 election results
 List of Historical Cabinet Ministers

Notes

33